Jonathan Carlos Jones (born November 18, 1997) is a professional gridiron football linebacker for the Toronto Argonauts of the Canadian Football League (CFL).

College career
After using a redshirt season in 2016, Jones played college football for the Notre Dame Fighting Irish from 2017 to 2019 where he played in 28 games and recorded 16 total tackles. He then transferred to the University of Toledo as a graduate transfer to play for the Rockets in 2020 and 2021. In two years, he played in 19 games where he had 116 total tackles, four sacks, two forced fumbles, and two fumble recoveries.

Professional career
On May 23, 2022, Jones signed with the Toronto Argonauts. Following 2022 training camp, he was placed on the team's practice roster, but made his professional debut on June 25, 2022, against the BC Lions, where he recorded one special teams tackle. He returned to the active roster in week 8, but dislocated his shoulder and was placed on the team's injured list. Once healthy, he returned to the practice roster for two weeks.

Following an injury to the team's incumbent starting weak-side linebacker, Wynton McManis, Jones made his first career start on October 8, 2022, against the Lions, where he had one defensive tackle. He started the last four games of the regular season and finished the year having played in six regular season games where he had ten defensive tackles, five special teams tackles, one sack, and two interceptions. Due to his strong play, Jones remained in the lineup for the East Final against the Montreal Alouettes, despite McManis returning from injury, where he had three defensive tackles in his post-season debut.

Personal life
Jones was born to parents Charles and Sharma Jones.

References

External links
 Toronto Argonauts bio

1997 births
Living people
American football linebackers
American players of Canadian football
Canadian football linebackers
Players of American football from Florida
Players of Canadian football from Florida
Toledo Rockets football players
Toronto Argonauts players
Notre Dame Fighting Irish football players